The Kir ( or Kiri) is a river in northern Albania that first flows south-southwest and then southwest out of the North Albanian Alps and enters a distributary of the Drin just below Shkodër.

In the upper reaches the river cuts the "Canyon of the Kir" with dramatic cliffs.The Albanian tribe or fis of Kiri inhabited this area.  Just outside Shkodër, in Mes, the old stone Mes Bridge crosses the Kir.

Notes

External links
  Static image
  Static image

Rivers of Albania
Geography of Shkodër County